The 1926 USC Trojans football team represented the University of Southern California (USC) in the 1926 college football season. In their second year under head coach Howard Jones, the Trojans compiled an 8–2 record (5–1 against conference opponents), finished in second place in the Pacific Coast Conference, and outscored their opponents by a combined total of 317 to 52. The season featured the first game in the Notre Dame–USC football rivalry; Notre Dame won by a 13 to 12 score in Los Angeles. The team was ranked No. 6 in the nation in the Dickinson System ratings released in December 1926. Offensive tackle Marion Morrison would later begin a successful acting career under the stage name, John Wayne.

Schedule

References

USC
USC Trojans football seasons
USC Trojans football